Dragomirești is a commune in Vaslui County, Western Moldavia, Romania. It is composed of twelve villages: Băbuța, Belzeni, Boțoi, Ciuperca, Doagele, Dragomirești, Poiana Pietrei, Popești, Rădeni, Semenea, Tulești and Vladia.

References

Communes in Vaslui County
Localities in Western Moldavia